Xuân Phú is a ward of Huế in Thừa Thiên Huế Province, Vietnam.

References

Populated places in Thừa Thiên Huế province